Robert Gerhard i Ottenwaelder (25 September 1896 – 5 January 1970) was a Spanish Catalan  composer and musical scholar and writer, generally known outside Catalonia as Roberto Gerhard.

Life 
Gerhard was born in Valls, near Tarragona, Spain, the son of a German-Swiss father and an Alsatian mother. He was predisposed to an international, multilingual outlook. He studied piano with Enrique Granados and composition with scholar-composer Felip Pedrell, teacher of Isaac Albéniz, Granados and Manuel de Falla. When Pedrell died in 1922, Gerhard tried unsuccessfully to become a pupil of Falla and considered studying with Charles Koechlin in Paris but then approached Arnold Schoenberg, who on the strength of a few early compositions accepted him as his only Spanish pupil. Gerhard spent several years with Schoenberg in Vienna and Berlin.

Returning to Barcelona in 1928, he devoted his energies to new music through concerts and journalism, in conjunction with the flourishing literary and artistic avant-garde of Catalonia. He befriended Joan Miró and Pablo Casals, brought Schoenberg and Anton Webern to Barcelona, and was the principal organizer of the 1936 ISCM Festival there. He also collected, edited and performed folksongs and old Spanish music from the Renaissance to the eighteenth century.

Identified with the Republican cause throughout the Spanish Civil War (as musical adviser to the Minister of Fine Arts in the Catalan Government and a member of the Republican Government's Social Music Council), Gerhard was forced to flee to France in 1939 and later that year settled in Cambridge, England. Until the death of Francisco Franco, his music was virtually proscribed in Spain, to which he never returned except for holidays. Apart from copious work for the BBC and in the theatre, Gerhard's compositions of the 1940s were explicitly related to aspects of Spanish and Catalan culture, beginning in 1940 with a Symphony in memory of Pedrell and the first version of the ballet Don Quixote. They culminated in a masterpiece as The Duenna (a Spanish opera on an English play by Richard Brinsley Sheridan, which is set in Spain). The Covent Garden production of Don Quixote and the BBC broadcasts of The Duenna popularized Gerhard's reputation in the UK though not in Spain.

During the 1950s, the legacy of Schoenbergian serialism, a background presence in these overtly national works, engendered an increasingly radical approach to composition which, by the 1960s, placed Gerhard firmly in the ranks of the avant-garde. From the early 1950s Gerhard suffered from a heart condition which eventually ended his life. He died in Cambridge in 1970 and is buried at the Parish of the Ascension Burial Ground in Cambridge, with his wife Leopoldina 'Poldi' Feichtegger Gerhard (1903–1994).

His archive is kept at Cambridge University Library. Other personal papers of Robert Gerhard are preserved in the Biblioteca de Catalunya.

Music

Stylistic evolution 
For twenty years – first in Barcelona and then in exile in England – Gerhard cultivated, and enormously enriched, a modern tonal idiom with a pronounced Spanish-folkloric orientation that descended on the one hand from Pedrell and Falla, and on the other from such contemporary masters as Bartók and Stravinsky. This was the idiom whose major achievements included the ballets Soirées de Barcelone and Don Quixote, the Violin Concerto and the opera The Duenna.

Gerhard often said that he stood by the sound of his music: 'in music the sense is in the sound'. Yet dazzling as their scoring is, his last works are in no sense a mere succession of sonic events. Their forms are meticulously organized and several make use of his special development of serialism where a twelve-tone pitch series, governing intervallic relations, interacts with a twelvefold time series governing the music's duration and proportions.

Selected list of works 

Gerhard's most significant works, apart from those already mentioned, include four symphonies (the Third, Collages, for orchestra and tape), the Concerto for Orchestra, concertos for violin, piano and harpsichord, the cantata The Plague (after Albert Camus), the ballets Pandora and Ariel, and pieces for a wide variety of chamber ensembles, including Sardanas for the indigenous Catalan street band, the cobla. He was perhaps the first important composer of electronic music in Britain; his incidental music for the 1955 Stratford-on-Avon King Lear – one of many such commissions for the Royal Shakespeare Company – was the first electronic score for the British stage.

Symphonies 
 Symphony Homenaje a Pedrell (1941)
 Symphony No. 1 (1952–53)
 Symphony No. 2 (1957–59); recomposition as Metamorphosis, unfinished (1967–68)
 Symphony No. 3 Collages (for orchestra and tape) (1960)
 Symphony No. 4 New York (1967)
 Symphony No. 5 (fragment only) (1969)
 (for Chamber Symphony Leo see "Chamber music")

Stage works 
 Ariel, ballet (1934)
 Soirées de Barcelone, ballet in three tableaux (1937–39; edited and orchestration completed by Malcolm MacDonald, 1996)
 Don Quixote, ballet (original version 1940–41, rev. 1947–49)
 Alegrias, Divertissement flamenco (1942)
 Pandora, ballet (1943–44, orch. 1944–45)
 The Duenna, English opera after Sheridan (1947–49). Radio performance was in 1949, at BBC; its first scenic performance was in 1992 at Teatro de la Zarzuela, Madrid, and Gran Teatre del Liceu, Barcelona. The Bielefeld Opera and conductor Geoffrey Moull performed The Duenna in a new production in 1994. The Wiener Zeitung at the time remarked that the work is "a rediscovered stroke of genius".
 El barberillo de Lavapies, arrangement and orchestration of the zarzuela (1874) by Francisco Barbieri (1954)
 Lamparilla, German-language Singspiel loosely based on El barberillo de Lavapies with additional music and original overture by Gerhard (1955–56)

Concertos 
 Concertino for string orchestra (1929)
 Violin Concerto (1942–43)
 Concerto for Piano and String Orchestra (1951)
 Concerto for Harpsichord, String Orchestra and Percussion (1955–56)
 Concerto for Orchestra (1965)

Orchestral works 
 Albada, Interludi i Dansa (1936)
 Epithalamion (1966)
 Various suites from Soirées de Barcelone, Don Quixote, Alegrias, Pandora

Chamber and instrumental music 
 Sonatine a Carlos, piano (1914)
 Trio in B major for violin, cello and piano (1918)
 Trio No. 2 for violin, cello and piano (1918)
 Dos Apunts, piano (1921–22)
 3 string quartets composed up to 1928 (all lost; No. 3 (1928) was reworked as the Concertino for strings)
 Sonata, clarinet and piano (1928; also version for bass clarinet and piano)
 Wind Quintet (1928, his first serial work)
 Andantino, clarinet, violin and piano (period 1928–29)
 String Quartet No. 1 (1950–55)
 Sonata, viola and piano (1948; recomposed 1956 as sonata for cello and piano)
 Capriccio, solo flute (1949)
 3 Impromptus, piano (1950)
 Secret People (study for the film score) for clarinet, violin and piano (1951–52)
 Nonet (1956–57)
 Fantasia, guitar (1957)
 String Quartet No. 2 (1961–62)
 Concert for 8 (1962)
 Chaconne, violin solo (1959)
 Hymnody for large wind ensemble, two pianos and percussion (1963)
 Gemini, Duo for violin and piano (1966)
 Libra, sextet (1968)
 Leo, Chamber Symphony (1969)

Vocal works 
 L'infantament meravellós de Shahrazada Song-cycle for voice and piano, Op. 1 (1916–18)
 Verger de les galanies for voice and piano (1917–18)
 7 Haiku for voice and ensemble (1922 rev. 1958)
 14 Cançons populars catalanes for voice and piano (1928–29; six numbers orchestrated 1931 as 6 Cançons Populars Catalanes)
 L'alta naixenca del Rei en Jaume, cantata for soprano, baritone, chorus and orchestra (1932)
 Cancionero de Pedrell for voice and piano or chamber orchestra (1941)
 3 Canciones Toreras for voice and orchestra (c. 1943) [composed under pseudonym "Juan Serralonga"]
 6 Chansons populaires françaises for voice and piano (1944)
 The Akond of Swat for voice and percussion (1954)
 Cantares for voice and guitar (1962; incorporates Fantasia for guitar)
 The Plague, cantata for narrator, chorus and orchestra, after Camus (1963–64)

Electronic music 
 Audiomobiles I-IV (1958–59)
 Lament for the death of Bullfighter for speaker and tape (1959)
 Caligula (1960–61)
 10 Pieces for tape (c. 1961)
 Sculptures I-V (1963)
 DNA in Reflection (1963)
 Anger of Achilles (1964) with Delia Derbyshire
 also tape component in Symphony No.3 and in many film, radio and theatre scores

Fantasias on themes from Zarzuelas 
(for light orchestra; composed c. 1943 under the pseudonym "Juan Serralonga")
 Cadiz, after Chuca & Valverde (1943)
 Gigantes y Cabezudos, after Caballero (c. 1943)
 La Viejecita, after Caballero (c. 1943)

Film music 
 Secret People (1952)
 This Sporting Life (1963)

Articles and broadcasts by Gerhard 

 'Roberto Gerhard's Symphony': Radio Times, Oct 23, 1959, p. 9 (An introduction to the Second Symphony, which was commissioned by the BBC and first performed and broadcast on Oct 28, 1959. Gerhard also contributed an item on the work to 'Music Magazine' on the BBC Home Service, Oct 25, 1959.)
 Gerhard worked with Lionel Salter on a radio series, The Heritage of Spain, broadcast on the BBC Third Programme in 26 parts from January 1954.

Sources 
 Monty Adkins, Michael Russ. The Roberto Gerhard Companion, Ashgate (2013) 
 Gerhard, Roberto, and Meirion Bowen. 2000. Gerhard on Music: Selected Writings, edited by Meirion Bowen. Aldershot [Hants, UK] and Burlington [Vermont]: Ashgate. 
 Joaquim Homs. Robert Gerhard y su obra. (Ethos-Musica; 16). Universidad de Oviedo, 1987. 
 Homs, Joaquim. 1991. Robert Gerhard i la seva obra. Barcelona: Biblioteca de Catalunya. 
 Proceedings of the 1st International Roberto Gerhard Conference : May 27–28th 2010. England: Centre for Research in New Music, University of Huddersfield, 2010. 
 London Sinfonietta. 1974. Programme book for The complete Instrumental and Chamber Music of Arnold Schoenberg and Roberto Gerhard. London: London Sinfonietta.
 The Score, September 1956. On the occasion of Gerhard's birthday, with articles by Donald Mitchell, Norman Del Mar, John Gardner, Roman Vlad, David Drew, Laurence Picken and Gerhard himself. 
 Routh, Francis. Contemporary British Music (1972), pp. 175-187.

References

Further reading
Nash, Peter Paul. 1981. "The Wind Quintet". Tempo, new series, no. 139 (December): 5–11.
 Diego Alonso. "Un hito de la modernidad musical española: el primer Apunt para piano de Roberto Gerhard", Acta musicologica, Vol. 89, Nº 2, 2017, págs. 171-194
 Diego Alonso. "“A Heretic in the Schoenberg Circle: Roberto Gerhard’s First Engagement with Twelve-Tone Procedures in Andantino”, Twentieth-Century Music 16 / 3 (2019): 557-588. https://doi.org/10.1017/S1478572219000306  
 Diego Alonso. “Homage to Schoenberg and Bartók: Symmetry, Transpositional Combination and Octatonicism in the First Movement of Roberto Gerhard’s Quartetto No. 3.” Music Analysis 39 / 2 (2020), 190–213.  https://doi.org/10.1111/musa.12156
 List of émigré composers in Britain

External links 
 
Roberto Gerhard at Boosey & Hawkes
Personal papers of Robert Gerhard in the Biblioteca de Catalunya

1896 births
1970 deaths
20th-century classical composers
Twelve-tone and serial composers
Second Viennese School
Composers from Catalonia
Spanish classical composers
Spanish male classical composers
Spanish opera composers
Male opera composers
Opera composers from Catalonia
Ballet composers
Spanish people of German descent
Pupils of Arnold Schoenberg
20th-century Spanish musicians
People from Valls
20th-century Spanish male musicians